Rimantas Antanas Stankiavichus (26 July 1944 in Marijampolė, Lithuania – 9 September 1990 in Salgareda, Italy) was a Lithuanian test pilot and cosmonaut in the Soviet space shuttle Buran programme. He was killed in a crash of his Su-27 fighter plane during an airshow in Salgareda.'''

Biography 
In 1966 he graduated from Chernigov Higher Aviation School. After that he served as a USSR pilot in Germany, Egypt, and Turkmenistan. In 1975 Stankevičius graduated from the Fedotov Test Pilot School and became a test pilot. He has accomplished spin testing of MiG-29. He flew 57 types of aircraft and had over 4000 hours of flying experience. In 1982 he was graded as a 1st class test-pilot.

In 1979 he was assigned to the Buran programme. In February 1982 he passed all the required exams and became the first Lithuanian cosmonaut. After September 1984 he trained to fly the 11F35 (Buran, USSR space shuttle). Stankevičius accomplished 14 test-flights with Buran's counterpart BTS-02 aircraft and 6 taxi tests with Buran. He was both the pilot and the commander of the space shuttle.

In 1990 Rimantas Stankevičius participated the Everett Air Show with a Su-27 fighter jet. Soon after his return home, he went to Italy to replace another USSR pilot in Salgareda Air Show. On 9 September, during a flight in the show in a Su-27, he started a loop in a lower altitude than he estimated and made an unintentional touchdown. He died in the crash. The crash resulted in only one fatality aside from the pilot.

Stankevičius, along with Soviet Cosmonauts Igor Volk and Sergei Tresvyatskiy, worked closely with Americans in the late 1980s to improve relations during the Cold War. The three were involved in what is believed to be the first formation flight with Soviet SU-27 fighter planes and American F-16s in history in July 1990 (before the breakup of the USSR) at the Opening Ceremonies of the Goodwill Games in Seattle. The three also flew the first Americans, (8 members of the Organizing Committee of the 1990 Goodwill Games) since World War II in an Ilyushin Il-62 from Seattle to Petropavlovsk-Kamchatsky, USSR in 1989. Petropavlovsk-Kamchatsky was one of the most important and secretive air and submarine bases in the USSR. ref  "Who the Hell is Bob?" pages 255–260; 278-280

Death
Stankevičius was killed in the crash of a Sukhoi Su-27 fighter, '14 Red', at the Salgareda Air Show at Treviso, Italy on 9 September 1990.
 
Stankevičius is buried in Kaunas, Lithuania.

References

External links
 Su-27 crash Salgareda Airshow 1990 – YouTube

1944 births
1990 deaths
Aviators killed in aviation accidents or incidents in Italy
Buran program
People from Marijampolė
Soviet cosmonauts
Lithuanian aviators
Lithuanian astronauts
Lithuanian cosmonauts
Soviet Air Force officers
Soviet test pilots
Victims of aviation accidents or incidents in 1990
Fedotov TPS alumni
Gromov Flight Research Institute employees